Zeuneria is a genus of African  bush crickets in the subfamily Phaneropterinae and typical of the tribe Zeuneriini.

Species
The Orthoptera species file includes:
 Zeuneria biramosa Sjöstedt, 1929 
 Zeuneria centralis Rehn, J.A.G., 1914 
 Zeuneria longicercus Sjöstedt, 1929 
 Zeuneria melanopeza Karsch, 1889 - type species

References

Phaneropterinae
Tettigoniidae genera